Mordi anak Bimol (born 20 January 1985) is a Malaysian politician who has served as the Member of Parliament (MP) for Mas Gading since May 2018. He is a member of the Democratic Action Party (DAP), a component party of the Pakatan Harapan (PH) opposition coalition. He has also served as the Vice Chairman of DAP of Sarawak since November 2018 and Chairman of DAP of Tasik Biru. In addition, he served as the special assistant to Stampin MP and former Deputy Minister of Domestic Trade and Consumer Affairs Chong Chieng Jen.

Early life and education 
Mordi completed his secondary education at Sekolah Menengah Kebangsaan Batu Kawa (Batu Kawa National Secondary School). He later completed his tertiary education at University of Malaysia, Sarawak (UNIMAS), graduating with a degree in aquatic science in 2008. Mordi worked as a reporter for The Borneo Post's sister publication Utusan Borneo for a brief period.

Political career 
Mordi began his political career when he joined the DAP in 2011. He has served as special assistant to DAP vice chairman and Sarawak state liaison committee chairman Chong Chieng Jen ever since.

In May 2013, Mordi contested in his first election after being selected as the DAP candidate to contest in a four-cornered fight for the Mas Gading federal seat during the 13th Malaysian general election. Whilst campaigning, Mordi was rushed to hospital in Bau after experiencing some difficulty in breathing and chest pain. He eventually finished third in the polls.

In November 2015, Mordi was elected into the 15-member DAP Sarawak state liaison committee.

In April 2016, Mordi was announced as DAP's candidate to contest for the Tasik Biru state seat in the 11th Sarawak state election by Chong during the launch of the party's new operations centre. However, Mordi was unsuccessful in his challenge against his opponent from the Progressive Democratic Party (PDP).

On 10 May 2018, Mordi was elected as an MP following the results of the historic 14th Malaysian general election. His victory was considered a surprise as in doing so, he managed to defeat the incumbent, Anthony Nogeh Gumbek, who was touted as a heavyweight as the then-caretaker Deputy Minister of Agriculture and Agro-based Industry of Malaysia. Later in November 2018, Mordi was elected as vice chairman of DAP's Sarawak state liaison committee alongside Padungan assemblyman (MLA) Wong King Wei.

Election results

Personal life 
On 10 August 2019, Mordi was married to Gracella Santianna Yong at his hometown Bau.

See also 
 Mas Gading (federal constituency)
 Tasik Biru (state constituency)

External links

References 

1985 births
Living people
People from Sarawak
People from Kuching
Bidayuh people
Sarawak politicians
Democratic Action Party (Malaysia) politicians
Members of the Dewan Rakyat
20th-century Malaysian people
21st-century Malaysian politicians